Lake Acucocha (possibly from Quechua aqu sand, qucha lake, "sand lake") is a lake in the Pasco Region in Peru. It is located in the Pasco Province, in the districts of Simón Bolívar and Tinyahuarco, approximately 27 kilometres from Tinyahuarco. It belongs to the watershed of the Mantaro River.

It is operated by Cia Minera Volcan.

See also
List of lakes in Peru

References

INEI, Compendio Estadistica 2007, page 26

Lakes of Peru
Lakes of Pasco Region
Dams in Peru
Buildings and structures in Pasco Region